Gregersen is a North German, Danish and Norwegian patronymic surname, literally meaning "son of Gregers" (equivalent of "Γρηγόριος", cf. English Gregory). It is an unusual surname in Denmark, shared by little more than 5,800 persons.
It may refer to:

 Atli Gregersen (born 1982), Faroese footballer
 Hans Gregersen (born 1962), Danish bioengineer
 Maria Gregersen (born 1983), Danish fashion model
 Mette Gregersen, Danish cricketer
 Peter K. Gregersen (born 1950), American geneticist
 Gudbrand Gregersen de Saág (1824–1910), Norwegian-born Hungarian bridge engineer, architect

References

Danish-language surnames
Patronymic surnames